Sydney Smirke  (20 December 1797 – 8 December 1877) was a British architect.

Smirke who was born in London, England as the fifth son of painter Robert Smirke and his wife, Elizabeth Russell. He was the younger brother of Sir Robert Smirke and Sir Edward Smirke, who was also an architect. Their sister Mary Smirke was a noted painter and translator.

He received the RIBA Royal Gold Medal in 1860. He became an associate of the Royal Academy in 1847 and was elected a full Academician in 1859. He served as RA Treasurer from 1861 to 1874, and was professor of Architecture from 1860 to 1865.

Personal life
He married Isabella Dobson, daughter of Newcastle upon Tyne architect John Dobson on 8 December 1840 at Newcastle upon Tyne.

Among Smirke's numerous apprentices was the successful York architect George Fowler Jones.

Smirke's works
Sydney Smirke's works include:
 Customs House, High Street, Shoreham-by-Sea (1830)
 Customs House (refronting), Quayside, Newcastle upon Tyne, (1833)
 The Custom House, Queen Square, Bristol (1835–57)
 Wellington Pit Surface Buildings (Whitehaven) (1840)
 The nave roof of York Minster (1840–44)
 Holy Trinity Church, Bickerstaffe, Lancashire (1843)
 The Carlton Club in Pall Mall, London (1845)
 The Custom House, Commercial Road, Gloucester (1845)
 The dome chapel of the Bethlem Royal Hospital, St George's Fields, Southwark (now housing the Imperial War Museum) (1846)
 The Frewen Mausoleum at St Mary's Church, Northiam, East Sussex (1846)
 St. James' Church, Westhead, Lancashire (1850)
 St Mary the Virgin's Church, Theydon Bois (1850)
 The Derby Hall, Derby Hotel and Athenaeum in Bury (1849–52; the latter two now demolished)
 The circular reading room at the British Museum (1857)
 King Edward's School, Witley, Surrey (1865) 
 Exhibition galleries at Burlington House, home of the Royal Academy (1868)

 Hall of Inner Temple (1870)
 St John's Church, Loughton
 Landscaping of Brookwood Cemetery, near Woking, Surrey (with William Tite)
 Toll House, Lower Sandgate Road, Folkestone
 Barkham Street, Wainfleet All Saints

References

Further reading
 Fawcett, Jane (Editor), Seven Victorian Architects, Thames and Hudson, 1976. 
 Gentleman's Magazine, 1841, Part 1, p91
 Oxford Dictionary of National Biography

External links
 Profile on Royal Academy of Arts Collections

1797 births
1877 deaths
Royal Academicians
19th-century English architects
People associated with the British Museum
Recipients of the Royal Gold Medal
Architects from London
Fellows of the Geological Society of London
Fellows of the Society of Antiquaries of London